Jerry Kennedy (born 21 September 1938) is a South African former cricketer. He played in one List A and three first-class matches for Boland in 1980/81.

See also
 List of Boland representative cricketers

References

External links
 

1938 births
Living people
South African cricketers
Boland cricketers
People from Strand, Western Cape
Cricketers from the Western Cape